Barroosky (Also spelt as Barroskey or Barrooskey. Irish: Barr rúscaigh, meaning "marshy land") is a townland within the civil parish of Kilcommon in the County of Mayo, Ireland. It is located within the parish of Kilcommon-Erris.

History 

Little is known of the early-history of Barroosky however it is mentioned in the 1900s in an article about the battle of Glenamoy which took place in 1922. It also is mentioned in a 'popular Erris folk tale' called the 'Fool of Barr Rúscaigh' as part of the year of the french celebrations. In fiction it is mentioned in the epic tale of Táin Bó Flidhais. In 1911 the population was recorded as 34 , notable families included the Healy's, the Clarke's, the Rielly's, the Ginty's, the O'Boyle's and the Moran's. The predominant religious belief of the inhabitants of Barroosky in 1911 was Roman Catholicism which was the predominant faith in Ireland at that time.

Agriculture and geography of Barroosky 
The area in which the Barroosky lies on is mostly covered in peaty, blanket bog which covers a vast area over parts of the North mayo coastlines of Kilcommon and the Barony of Erris.

Glenamoy Bog Complex 
The Glenamoy Bog Complex is a large site situated in the extreme north-west of Erris, Co. Mayo, incorporating both inland and coastal regions. The climate is wet and oceanic and there are frequent strong winds across the area which is largely treeless and relatively exposed. The bog complex area is drained by four main river systems - the Glenamoy, the Muingnabo, the Belderg and the Glenglassra rivers. Extreme oceanic blanket bog dominates the site in its inland areas. The coastal habitats of Glenamoy bog complex are extensive and varied. Sea cliffs dominate the coastline reaching a height of 253 metres at Benwee Head. There are many steep-sided islands off the coastline which are mainly used a summer grazing for livestock if the area of machair on them is large enough. Bog can be used a rich source of fuel and has been harvested for centuries, however it is more difficult to be used for agriculture because of its acidic properties and moistness of its soil.

Sheskin Forestry 
Barroosky is situated near to the Sheskin Forest (not to be confused with Sheskin, Monaghan) which stretches from near Ballycastle to Bellacorick. The forest is a large area of conifer forest plantation established on the bog lands of north Mayo. A hunting lodge built by the McDonnell family and later owned by the Jameson family, now in ruins lies there.

Gallery

See also 
Glenamoy
County Mayo
Kilcommon
Erris
Irish Language

References 

Townlands of County Mayo